Iké Boys is a 2021 American mixed media fantasy film directed by Eric McEver and starring Quinn Lord, Ronak Gandhi, and Christina Higa as three teenagers who acquire superpowers from a magical anime film. Billy Zane, Yumiko Shaku, and Ben Browder are featured in supporting roles.

Plot

Best friends Shawn Gunderson and Vikram ‘Vik’ Kapoor escape from the drudgery of high school life in Oklahoma through their obsession with all things Japanese. When a mysterious anime film transforms them into its superhuman characters, they at first think that their wildest fantasies have come true. But when ancient monsters threaten to unleash the apocalypse on New Year's Eve of 1999, Shawn and Vik must look to each other to become the heroes they were always meant to be. Joining their adventure is Miki, a Japanese exchange student whose determination to go on a Native American vision quest puts her on a collision course with both Shawn and Vik and their foes... and whose destiny may determine the fate of the world.

Cast
Quinn Lord as Shawn Gunderson
Ronak Gandhi as Vikram "Vik" Kapoor
Christina Higa as Miki Shimizu
Billy Zane as Newt Grafstrom
Yumiko Shaku as Reiko Grafstrom
Ben Browder as Wayne Gunderson
Gary England as Weatherman

Production
Production took place in Oklahoma at the beginning of 2020, with postproduction conducted during the COVID-19 pandemic. The original 2D animation was produced by teams in France and Taiwan, paying stylistic homage to Japanese anime of the 1980s and 1990s. The climactic battle was produced by a team of Japanese tokusatsu veterans, with explosives detonated using the same pyrotechnics rig as in Godzilla.

Release
The film premiered at the Fantastic Fest on September 26, 2021. It had its international premiere at the Bucheon International Fantastic Film Festival on July 7, 2022. Shout! Studios acquired the North American rights to the film, which was released on October 11, 2022.

Reception 
The film has a 100% rating on Rotten Tomatoes based on 11 reviews. Harris Dang of In Their Own League wrote, "[the film] is a charming, entertaining and goofy trifle that honours its inspirations with love and respect while providing a warm story about will resonate with young audiences about passion, adventure and friendship." Amelia Emberwing of Slash Film gave the film a positive review and wrote, "The earnest nature of the film is both its greatest strength and its greatest weakness. But I'll take dorky earnestness over cool glibness any day." Andrew Mack of Screen Anarchy also gave it a positive review and wrote, "The action is just a fun way to reward yourself for learning something other than how to land a proper hero stance off your living room couch."

References

External links
 
 

2020s English-language films
American fantasy films
American coming-of-age films
American robot films
American monster movies
Japan in non-Japanese culture
2020s American films